Large neutral amino acids transporter small subunit 3 is a protein that in humans is encoded by the SLC43A1 gene.

See also

References

Further reading

Solute carrier family